Earlsfield is an area within the London Borough of Wandsworth, London, England. It is a typical south London suburb and comprises mostly residential Victorian terraced houses with a high street of shops, bars, and restaurants between Garratt Lane, Allfarthing Lane, and Burntwood Lane.  The population of Earlsfield at the 2001 Census was 12,903, increasing to 15,448 at the 2011 Census.

Earlsfield railway station provides access to central London (three stops to London Waterloo (Clapham Junction, Vauxhall, Waterloo) in 12 minutes) and other areas in South London (Victoria - changing at Clapham Junction, Wimbledon one stop). The station's redevelopment was completed in April 2013.

History 
In medieval times, the area now known as Earlsfield was the northern part of the manor and hamlet of Garrat (also spelt Garratt, Garrett or Garret) in the parish of Wandsworth and notorious in the 18th century for the Garrat mock elections. By then the area was already industrialised with numerous mills along the River Wandle and in the early 19th century London's first railway, the horse-drawn Surrey Iron Railway, ran along Garratt Lane. This was followed in 1838 by the opening of the London and South Western Railway which originally passed through without stopping. Later in the century, suburban development began to creep across from Wandsworth Common.

In April 1884, the L&SWR opened Earlsfield station on Garratt Lane, prompting further development. The station was named after a nearby residence, Earlsfield, now demolished. This was owned by the Davis family, who also owned the land required for the station, and one of the conditions of sale was that the station would be named after their house.

The area was once a working-class suburb of Wandsworth and as such much of the property is medium-sized terraced housing, though several new developments have been or are being developed, notably the Olympian Homes development between the station and library. The area now houses young families attracted by the affordability of the area in comparison to its northern, western and eastern neighbours, Clapham, Wandsworth, Battersea and Putney, contributing to the wider area's nickname of Nappy Valley.

Earlsfield Library has on display a range of historic photographs of the area.

Between 1853 and 1864, the area in the south of Earlsfield, Summerstown, was the site of the Copenhagen Running Grounds, a major venue for pedestrianism.

Haldane Place, near the Wandle, was the site of the main manufacturing base for Airfix between 1939 and 1981.

Geography 

The River Wandle flows roughly parallel to Garratt Lane through the area, and has been the subject of a major, council-funded clean-up operation, though it has been subjected to several pollution incidents in the past few years. There is some light industry located between the high street and the river.

High Street 

The main shopping street - Garratt Lane - includes estate agents, cafes and restaurants, pubs, bars and hairdressers. The stretch of Earlsfield just to the south of the station includes chains such as Costa Coffee, KFC, Starbucks, and a Sainsbury's Local situated next to the library in Magdalen Road. There's a Tesco's local just to the north of the station but an increasing number of independent cafes, delicatessen, butchers and public houses including The Earlsfield situated in the old railway station house have opened in recent years.

Garratt Lane is home to cross-cultural theatre company Tara Arts and its venue Tara Theatre.  Opened in 2007 (and refurbished in 2016), the space plays host to local and national companies as well as staging its own productions.

Several businesses are based in Smiths Yard off Summerley Street including Michael Jones Properties - Keller Williams Earlsfield who are a bespoke Estate  Agency.

There are two churches in the centre - Earlsfield Baptist church (opened in 1900) on Magdalen Road and St Andrew's, Earlsfield (Church of England, built in two stages between 1888 and 1902 ) on the corner of Garratt Lane and Waynflete Street, with St Gregory's (Catholic) and St John the Divine (CoE) further down Garratt Lane towards Wandsworth.

Notable residents 
Louis de Bernières – He lived in Earlsfield while writing Captain Corelli's Mandolin. His book and play Sunday Morning At the Centre of the World  "is a homage to the diverse community of Earlsfield."
Sadiq Khan – Former MP for Tooting (which includes Earlsfield within its constituency boundaries) and Mayor of London since May 2016. He lived as a child in the Henry Prince Estate on Garratt Lane.
 The unnamed detective sergeant narrator of the Factory Novels by Derek Raymond lives in a police flat in Earlsfield.

Neighbours 
Wandsworth Common SW17
Clapham SW12
Battersea SW11
Wandsworth SW18
Tooting SW17
Southfields SW19
Putney SW15

Next stop neighbouring travel connections
 Inbound: Clapham Junction
 Outbound: Wimbledon

References

External links 
Earlsfield Community
Edith's Streets - history by street

Areas of London
Districts of the London Borough of Wandsworth
District centres of London